The Morgan Iron Works was a 19th-century manufacturing plant for   marine steam engines located in New York City, United States. Founded as T. F. Secor & Co. in 1838, the plant was later taken over and renamed by one of its original investors, Charles Morgan.

The Morgan Iron Works remained a leading manufacturer of marine engines throughout the 19th century, producing at least 144 in the period between 1838 and 1867, including 23 for U.S. Navy vessels during the American Civil War.

The Morgan Iron Works was sold to shipbuilder John Roach in 1867, who integrated its operations with his shipyard in Chester, Pennsylvania. The Works continued to operate as both an engine plant and a ship repair facility in the hands of Roach and his son John Baker Roach until 1907, when the Roach family finally retired from the shipbuilding business.

Secor & Co., 1838–1850

The marine engine works of T. F. Secor and Co. was originally established in New York City, at Ninth Street, East River, in 1838. The works was at this time owned by three partners—T. F. Secor, William K. Caulkin and budding transport entrepreneur Charles Morgan, each of whom had one-third ownership of the new firm.

In 1845, the U.S. Congress made a number of legislative changes, including the establishment of subsidies, which were aimed at allowing American shipping lines to compete more effectively with their British counterparts. The new legislation contributed to a growing demand in the United States for steamships, encouraging Morgan to divest himself of the last of his shares in sailing vessels and plough the money instead into the Secor plant, which was expanded to include one and a half blocks between Eight and Tenth Streets. By this time, the plant employed up to 700 men, and was building engines for both coastal and oceangoing steamships.

Morgan/Quintard ownership, 1850–1867  
 
In 1847, Morgan appointed his son-in-law, George W. Quintard, to the financial department of Secor & Co. Quintard proved a capable manager and rose quickly in the firm. Morgan bought out the other partners in February 1850 and renamed the firm the Morgan Iron Works. Quintard became the plant's new manager, a position he was to retain until the sale of the firm to John Roach in 1867. Morgan, now the plant's sole owner, was the firm's financier, supplying its capital and credit.

The only variation to this arrangement occurred between May 1, 1857 to May 1, 1861, when Morgan's other son-in-law, Charles A. Whitney, joined the firm as co-manager. During this period, Morgan conveyed the Works to the ownership of Quintard and Whitney for the sum of $250,000, giving Whitney a one-third stake in the company and Quintard the remainder. The two manager-owners took out a $67,000 mortgage on the property to raise operating capital. After Whitney left the firm to pursue other business interests, Morgan returned as sole owner, purchasing the business for its sale price of $250,000 as of a few years prior, and settling the mortgage himself.

1850s 

Following the Morgan takeover in 1850, Quintard embarked on an extensive improvement program for the Works, installing steam hammers, a floating steam derrick and other heavy equipment, as well as building a new dockyard on the East River. Quintard also began diversifying the firm's products, manufacturing machinery for Cuban sugar mills and large pumps for a Chicago water company.

By this time, Morgan himself, whose transportation business was steadily expanding, had become the plant's main customer. In 1850, Morgan ordered the 1,875 ton steamer San Francisco and the 1,359 ton Brother Jonathan, both built for operation with Morgan's Empire City Line. In 1852, he decided to replace some of his older ships, and ordered Texas (1,151 tons), Louisiana (1,056 t), Mexico (1,043 t), Perseverance (827 t) and Meteor (542 t) all of which had engines built by the Morgan Iron Works.

In the same period, Morgan lost to accidents four of his existing ships: Palmetto, Globe, Galveston and the newly built Meteor, with a total value of $250,000. As all four ships had been self-insured in line with Morgan's usual practice, none of the losses were recoverable. Morgan was by this time wealthy enough to be able to absorb the losses however, and in the following two years he had another four vessels built, including Charles Morgan (1,215 tons), Nautilus (898 t), Orizaba (734 t) and Tennessee (1,149 t), all but the last of which also had their engines supplied by the Morgan Works.

The contract was met with charges of favoritism from Republicans, and in a subsequent Congressional enquiry, Quintard pointed out that the Works had bid for a number of navy contracts previously but never been successful. The inquiry ultimately rejected the charges.

By the end of the decade, the Morgan Works was one of America's leading manufacturers of marine steam engines, specializing in medium-sized machinery for coastal and river service. From 1850 through 1860, the Works built engines for a total of 49 vessels, and its engines were in use with American steamship companies from the United States to as far afield as China.

American Civil War, 1861–65  

The American Civil War began disastrously for Charles Morgan when the Confederacy seized his entire Gulf of Mexico fleet. In spite of this blow however, Morgan was to recover and profit handsomely from the war, mainly through the agency of the Morgan Iron Works.

The war created great demand for new shipping, and shipyards and engine manufacturers alike experienced an unprecedented boom. Like many other builders of marine engines, the Morgan Iron Works was to take full advantage of this demand, building engines for 38 vessels during the war, including 23 merchantmen and 13 warships for the U.S. Navy. The plant even found time to turn out an engine for an Italian Navy warship in this period, the Re Don Luige de Portogallo. The Works also contracted for the complete construction of the monitor , although the hull was subcontracted out to another firm.

By the end of the war, the Morgan Works had grossed $2,275,991.10 from its naval contracts alone. Morgan himself made further profits during the war by ordering ships from Harlan & Hollingsworth, which he then sold or chartered to the U.S. Navy.

Sale to John Roach, 1867 

After the war, the U.S. government auctioned off at firesale prices the hundreds of ships it had requisitioned during the conflict, depressing the market and leaving U.S. shipyards and marine engine builders with little or no work. As a consequence, most of the marine engine manufacturing companies of New York went out of business in the years immediately following the war. Two notable exceptions were the Morgan Iron Works, and the Etna Iron Works of John Roach.

Unlike his competitors, John Roach had been able to maintain his profits in the postwar period by diversifying his plant into the manufacture of machine tools and selling them to the U.S. Navy, which was in the process of upgrading its shipyards. By contrast, the Morgan Iron Works, like most other New York engine builders, had struggled in the postwar period, building only two engines in the two years following the war. It remained in business only because Morgan could afford to weather the losses, but in 1866 he suffered an additional financial setback when his newly established shipping lines to Mexico were aborted due to the overthrow of Maximilian I of Mexico.

John Roach meanwhile was planning to add shipbuilding to his engine building business, and he saw the Morgan Iron Works with its dockyard on the East River as a stepping stone toward this goal. When in 1867 he offered to purchase the Morgan Works, Morgan was ready to sell, and the two agreed upon a price of $450,000, divided into a cash payment of $100,000 and two mortgages of $100,000 and $250,000. Roach would soon run into cash flow problems of his own and consequently defaulted on both mortgages; Morgan however chose not to foreclose and Roach settled the debts shortly before Morgan's death in 1878.

Roach ownership, 1867–1907

By securing the premises of the Morgan Iron Works and buying out his remaining competitors, Roach had established a near ship and engine building monopoly in New York. He subsequently closed his Etna Iron Works, transferring the best personnel and equipment from Etna and his former competitors' premises to his newly acquired East River property, and thus turned the Morgan Works into America's premier manufacturer of marine steam engines.

In 1871, Roach bought the failed shipyard of Reaney, Son & Archbold in Chester, Pennsylvania, thoroughly modernized it, renamed it the Delaware River Iron Ship Building and Engine Works, and turned it into America's largest and most prolific shipyard, a position it maintained until the mid-1880s. In spite of the fact that the Chester shipyard had its own engine building plant, Roach retained ownership of the Morgan Iron Works, using it to build engines both for his own ships and for third party contracts, and also for ship repairs and outfitting of new vessels. Roach in fact expanded the Works for its new role, adding upholsterers for the production of ship's furniture and expanding the plumbing department. Additionally, he was able to use the Morgan Works to keep his business running during industrial action, when he would simply transfer his operations from one yard to the other.  He retained the name of the Morgan Iron Works, but made it a subsidiary of a new management company, John Roach & Son (later John Roach & Sons).

Following the settlement of all his debts however, his family found themselves still in possession of both the Chester shipyard and the Morgan Iron Works. Roach's oldest surviving son, John Baker Roach, took over running of the business as a whole, while his younger son Stephen became treasurer of the Morgan Works.

The brothers continued to run the business much as their father had done, although it lost the pre-eminent position it had previously enjoyed. With the death of John Baker Roach in 1908, the Roach family decided to end its association with shipbuilding, and both the Morgan Iron Works and the Chester shipyard were closed. The Morgan Works was converted into tenements, and in 1949, the locality where the Works had once stood was redeveloped into a low-rental housing project, the Jacob Riis Houses, which still exists today.

Production tables 

The following tables list marine engines built by T. F. Secor & Co. and the Morgan Iron Works to 1867. Few engines built under Roach management are listed as Roach had a second marine engine facility at Chester, Pennsylvania and available records generally do not distinguish between the output of the two plants.

Where a ship had more than one name, the names are listed chronologically in descending order, with two digits representing the last two digits of the year the rename took place (where known). Ship names in small type preceded or followed by an arrow (← →) indicate that the engine for this vessel was used in another ship.

Merchant steamship and steamboat engines

Warship engines

Footnotes

References

Bibliography

Books

Periodicals 
  
  
 
  
 The New York Times

Websites 
 Naval History and Heritage Command. United States Navy.

History of New York City
American companies established in 1838
Manufacturing companies established in 1838
John Roach & Sons
Defunct marine engineering companies of New York City
Defunct shipbuilding companies of the United States
Manufacturing companies based in New York City
1838 establishments in New York (state)